The name Dinang was used for two tropical cyclones by the Philippine Atmospheric, Geophysical and Astronomical Services Administration (PAGASA) in the Western Pacific Ocean.

 Typhoon Lee (1981) (T8129, 29W, Dinang) – a destructive late-season typhoon which impacted the Philippines, killing at least 188 people.
 Typhoon Ed (1993) (T9319, 25W, Dinang) – the only Category 5-equivalent typhoon to exist during 1993; did not affect land areas.

Pacific typhoon set index articles